Oldebroek is a municipality and a town in the province of Gelderland.

Population centres

Topography

Dutch Topographic map of the municipality of Oldebroek, June 2015

Sport
Oldebroek has been host to the Dutch Sidecarcross Grand Prix a number times

Notable people 

 Rudolph van Pallandt (1868–1913), sport shooter who competed at the 1908 Summer Olympics 
 Martin Koopman (born 1956 in Wezep), former football defender and football manager
 Jan Maarten Heideman (born 1973), speed skater 
 Lana Wolf (born 1975 in Wezep), pop singer
 Freek Jansen (born 1992), politician

Gallery

References

External links

Official Website

 
Municipalities of Gelderland
Populated places in Gelderland